Janna–Mari Hurmerinta (born 20 December 1981), better known by her mononym Janna, is a Finnish R&B, and pop singer, songwriter and pianist. Her debut album Right Now was released in June 2007 to critical acclaim. followed by The Makings of Me in 2008. In 2013, she was signed to Universal Music Finland. Her self-titled album Janna topped the Finnish album chart in June 2014.

Discography

Albums

Singles

Featured in

References

Living people
20th-century Finnish women singers
Singers from Helsinki
Finnish people of Italian descent
1981 births